Carrier Force is a 1983 computer wargame published by Strategic Simulations for the Apple II, Atari 8-bit family, and Commodore 64.

Carrier Force was Grigsby's fourth game. While he had started developing games part-time while working for the United States Department of Defense, he left to become a full-time game developer halfway through his third title, North Atlantic '86.

Gameplay
Carrier Force is a computer wargame that simulates aircraft carrier warfare.

Development
Carrier Force was the fourth game by designer Gary Grigsby. It was released in 1983, the same year he debuted North Atlantic '86.

Reception

Tom Cheche reviewed the game for Computer Gaming World, and stated that "CF has been exhaustively researched, and beautifully produced. In many ways it is the kind of game that we had in mind several years ago when we were daydreaming about where the wargaming hobby was headed now that the computer had arrived." 

In a 1985 survey of computer wargames for Current Notes, M. Evan Brooks called Carrier Force "worth the effort for anyone desirous of learning about the period", but considered it "extremely slow in execution" and saw it as having historical errors. In his similar 1989 survey, J. L. Miller of Computer Play found that the game was "hampered by very slow execution" and offered it a middling score.

Reviews
 Casus Belli #23 (Dec 1984)

Successor
Grigsby decided to build on Carrier Force in his later game Carrier Strike. He told Electronic Games, "I liked the subject matter and, given the evolution in computer capability and my programming skills, I wanted to refine it."

See also
Carriers at War

References

External links

Article in Tilt (French)

1983 video games
Aircraft carriers in fiction
Apple II games
Atari 8-bit family games
Commodore 64 games
Computer wargames
Japan in non-Japanese culture
Naval video games
Pacific War video games
Strategic Simulations games
Turn-based strategy video games
Video games developed in the United States